Charles Koerner (September 10, 1896 – February 2, 1946) was an American film executive, best known for being executive vice president over production at RKO Pictures from 1942 to 1946.

Koerner is best remembered for firing Orson Welles from RKO. However he was a highly successful executive, helping RKO turn around its financial performance from the George Schaefer regime.

Biography
Born to a Jewish family in New Orleans, he worked in theatres after school and went on to attend Shattuck Military Academy.

After the academy, he owned and managed a theatre but sold this when he enlisted for World War I.  After returning from war, he managed several theatre chains until one was sold to Hughes-Franklin in 1931 and he became the personal representative of Harold B. Franklin. Franklin later became the president of RKO's theatre division and put Koerner in charge of the theatres in the Southwestern United States.

Koerner was appointed vice president in charge of RKO's theatres in 1941. He took over from Joseph Breen as general manager of the studio in 1942.

Among Koerner's first actions was terminating the contract between RKO and Welles. (When told the news, Welles famously quipped "Don't worry, boys. We're just passing a bad Koerner.") He also ended the contract between RKO and Pare Lorentz.

Koerner's motto was "showmanship instead of genius." By the end of 1942 RKO was in the black for the first time in five years.

Among his most notable achievements were hiring Val Lewton.

Koerner supported Thomas Dewey in the 1944 United States presidential election.

Koerner died on February 2, 1946, from leukemia. He was temporarily replaced by Peter Rathvon before being permanently replaced by Dore Schary.

Jean Renoir called him "an extraordinary man... I deeply regretted his unfortunate death. Had he not died, I believe I should have made twenty films for RKO. I would have worked all my life at RKO. He was a man who knew the business and the exploitation of the cinema, but at the same time conceded that one must experiment."

He is portrayed by Brian Howe in the film Being the Ricardos.

Notable films under Koerner's regime
Cat People (1942)
I Walked with a Zombie (1943)
Murder, My Sweet (1944)
Bells of St Mary's (1945)
The Enchanted Cottage (1945)

References

American film producers
American Jews
1946 deaths
1896 births
Deaths from leukemia
Deaths from cancer in California